Rhacophorus catamitus is a species of frogs in the family Rhacophoridae. Its natural habitats are tropical forests. Males call from low vegetation near streams. It is probably impacted by habitat loss.

References

catamitus
Fauna of Sumatra
Endemic fauna of Indonesia
Amphibians of Indonesia
Frogs of Asia
Amphibians described in 2002
Taxonomy articles created by Polbot